White Air can refer to:
 White Air (extreme sports festival), an extreme sports festival held annually in Yaverland on the Isle of Wight.
 White Airways, a charter airline based in Lisbon, Portugal.